Charles Brigham (June 21, 1841 – July 1925) was an American architect based in Boston, Massachusetts.

Life 
Brigham was born, raised, and educated in Watertown, Massachusetts schools and graduated at age 15 in 1856 in the first class of Watertown High School. He had no formal education in architecture.

He apprenticed to Calvin Ryder and later to Boston architect Gridley J.F. Bryant.  Brigham served as a sergeant in the Union Army during the American Civil War, then returned to working with Bryant.  In 1866, Brigham and John Hubbard Sturgis formed a partnership which lasted 20 year.  In that times the firm was recognized for its innovative and groundbreaking designs, including the original building for the Museum of Fine Arts, Boston.

Brigham subsequently designed the 1898 annex to the Massachusetts State House in Boston, the 1906 The First Church of Christ, Scientist in Boston, and many residential buildings especially in the Boston Back Bay and Newport Rhode Island.

Brigham's work reflects the eclecticism and historicism prevalent in the last quarter of the 19th century, initiating fusion of the complex eclectic references of the English Queen Anne revival with American colonial design. The resulting coastal New England houses of the 1880s by Brigham and other Boston architects defined the shingle style in one of the most original and distinguished epochs of American architectural history, from which other notable architects, such as Henry Hobson Richardson, emerged. He also designed the Watertown town seal.

Work

With John Hubbard Sturgis 

 Codman Building, Boston, 1873
 Church of the Advent, Boston, 1875–1888
 Museum of Fine Arts, Boston, 1876
 86 Marlborough Street, Boston 1872

In solo practice 

 Trinity Episcopal Church (Melrose, Massachusetts), 1886
Hollis Hunnewell Cottage, Wellesley, Massachusetts, 1869
 Stoughton (MBTA station), Stoughton, Massachusetts, 1888
 Unitarian Building, First Parish of Watertown, Massachusetts, 1889
 Fairhaven Town Hall, Fairhaven, Massachusetts, 1892
 Millicent Library, Fairhaven, Massachusetts, 1893
 Annex to the Massachusetts State House in Boston, 1895
 New Bedford Institution for Savings, New Bedford, Massachusetts, 1897
 Scollay Square and Adams Square station entrances, 1898
 Albert C. Burrage House, Back Bay, Boston, 1899; designated as a Boston Landmark by the Boston Landmarks Commission in 2003
 Albert C. Burrage House, 1205 West Crescent Avenue, Redlands, California, 1899/1900
 Madison Public Library, now the Museum of Early Trades and Crafts, Madison, New Jersey, 1900
 Unitarian Memorial Church, Fairhaven, Massachusetts, 1901
 Fairhaven High School, Fairhaven, Massachusetts, 1905
 Messiah Home for Children, The Bronx, New York City, 1905–19hool
 Old Watertown High School, Watertown, Massachusetts, 1913
St. Mark the Evangelist Church, Dorchester, Massachusetts
St. Francis of Assisi Church, Braintree, Massachusetts

References

 Watertown Tribune-Enterprise, Watertown, Mass., Friday, July 24, 1925
Burrage House Study Report

Further reading 
 Adams, Oscar Fay, "A NEW ENGLAND ARCHITECT AND HIS WORK", The New England Magazine, June 1907

19th-century American architects
1841 births
1925 deaths
Architects from Boston
American Christian Scientists
Architects of Roman Catholic churches
20th-century American architects
People from Watertown, Massachusetts
People of Massachusetts in the American Civil War
Union Army soldiers
Watertown High School (Massachusetts) alumni